Magnolia cubensis, the Cuban magnolia or cashew of the Maestra, is a tree native to the island of Cuba in the West Indies. Seeds are reddish-orange.

References

cubensis
Flora of Cuba
Flora without expected TNC conservation status